At the 1921 Far Eastern Championship Games, the athletics events were held in Shanghai, China in May and June. A total of 18 athletics events were contested at the competition. The five-mile track race was held for the first time, replacing the road race over the same distance that featured at the previous edition. Lighter implements were adopted for the shot put in comparison to the international standard.

The Philippines won over half the available gold medals and were the most successful team in the athletics programme. Japan managed five golds and also nine silver medals in the sport. China performed poorly in comparison, receiving only six medals in total, although half of these were gold medals. Japan had most success in tracks events, particularly in middle- and long-distance running, where it completed a medal sweep. China won its four individual medals in field and combined track and field events. The Philippines had a top-two finisher in all but four events.

Fortunato Catalon defended both his sprint titles, maintaining his domination of the discipline since the 1917 games. Antonio Alo, another Filipino, was the only other person to defend a title from the 1919 event with a games record victory in the pole vault. Tu Jungtang was China's outstanding athlete as he won an unusual discus throw and pentathlon double.

Katsuo Okazaki, the winner of the mile run and 880-yards runner-up, later represented Japan at the 1924 Summer Olympics and went on to become the Japanese Minister of Foreign Affairs.

Medal summary

References

Results
Far Eastern Championships. GBR Athletics. Retrieved on 2014-12-18.

1921
Far Eastern Championship Games
1921 Far Eastern Championship Games
1921 in Chinese sport